Vodskov is a village near Aalborg in southern Vendsyssel with a population of 4,663 (1 January 2022) in Vodskov parish, Aalborg Municipality. The town lies in North Jutland, 11 kilometre northeast of Aalborg.

Transport 
From 1899 Vodskov had a railway station on Sæbybanen of Vodskov-Østervrå railway, but this was closed on 15 March 1950.

In Vodskov 
In Hammer Bakker's south, just north of Vodskov, is found a number of residential and educational institutions in the area and for many years housed a large mental asylum.

In Vodskov there are many interesting places including Vodskov Church and Vodskov School, which is among Aalborg Municipality's largest public schools.

References

External links 
 Vodskov IF
 Vodskov Erhvervsforening
 Vodskov Skole

 
Populated places established in 1726
1726 establishments in Denmark